William H. DeSmedt is an American author of science fiction. His debut novel, Singularity (2004), explores the 1908 Tunguska event and the speculative hypothesis that it was caused by a submicroscopic, primordial black hole. Although Singularity is a work of science fiction, in the tradition of Michael Crichton, its premise is anchored in real-world science.

In penning Singularity, Bill also drew on a deep knowledge of the Russian language, politics and culture, first acquired during eighteen months at the Defense Language Institute in Monterey, California, and added to while a US–USSR exchange student at Moscow State University.  He also holds a Master of Arts (M.A.) in Soviet Area Studies, and a Master of Science (M.S.) in Computer Science.

Fiction

Awards
 Foreword Magazine Book of the Year Awards: Winner  –  Gold Medal for Science Fiction, 2005 (Singularity)
 Independent Publishers Association: Winner  –  Ippy prize for Best Fantasy/Science Fiction novel, 2004 (Singularity)
 Publishers Marketing Association: Finalist  –  Ben Franklin “Best New Voice” Award, 2005 (Singularity)

Scientific concepts
In his debut novel, Singularity (2004), discusses the long-disparaged hypothesis that the devastation of the Tunguska basin in 1908 was caused by a submicroscopic, primordial black hole.

References

External links
 

21st-century American novelists
American science fiction writers
American thriller writers
Techno-thriller writers
Living people
Defense Language Institute alumni
American male novelists
21st-century American male writers
Year of birth missing (living people)